Blowtown is an unincorporated community in Jefferson County, in the U.S. state of Pennsylvania.

History
The first store in Blowtown was established in 1879.

References

Unincorporated communities in Jefferson County, Pennsylvania
Unincorporated communities in Pennsylvania